Ibrahim or Ibrahim bin Umar al-Kanemi (1840s-c. 1885) was Shehu of Borno from c. 1884 to c. 1885.

Reign of Ibrahim
Ibrahim became Shehu of Borno in 1884 at the death of his brother Bukar Kura. His uncle, Abba Masta Kura had been recognised Shehu before him but Ibrahim succeeded to bribe his way to the throne. His one-year reign was marked by an intense political crisis in Kukawa.

Dynasty

Footnotes

Bibliography
 Barth, Heinrich, Travels and Discoveries in North and Central Africa (London: Longman, 1857).
 Brenner, Louis, The Shehus of Kukawa: A History of the Al-Kanemi Dynasty of Bornu, Oxford Studies in African Affairs (Oxford, Clarendon Press, 1973).
 Cohen, Ronald, The Kanuri of Bornu, Case Studies in Cultural Anthropology (New York: Holt, 1967).
 Isichei, Elizabeth, A History of African Societies to 1870 (Cambridge: Cambridge University Press, 1997), pp. 318–320, .
 Lange, Dierk, 'The kingdoms and peoples of Chad', in General history of Africa, ed. by Djibril Tamsir Niane, IV (London: Unesco, Heinemann, 1984), pp. 238–265.
 Last, Murray, ‘Le Califat De Sokoto Et Borno’, in Histoire Generale De l'Afrique, Rev. ed. (Paris: Presence Africaine, 1986), pp. 599–646.
 Lavers, John, "The Al- Kanimiyyin Shehus: a Working Chronology" in Berichte des Sonderforschungsbereichs, 268, Bd. 2, Frankfurt a. M. 1993: 179-186.
 Nachtigal, Gustav, Sahara und Sudan : Ergebnisse Sechsjähriger Reisen in Afrika (Berlin: Weidmann, 1879).
 
 Palmer, Herbert Richmond, The Bornu Sahara and Sudan (London: John Murray, 1936).

External links
 Kanuri Studies Association

Royalty of Borno
1840s births
1885 deaths
19th-century rulers in Africa
19th-century Nigerian people